The People's Alternative Party or  in Malay Parti Alternatif Rakyat (abbrev: PAP) is a political party in Malaysia formed by a group of former Democratic Action Party (DAP) leaders and members led by former DAP vice-chairman Zulkifli Mohd Noor.

The PAP is based in Penang and intends to provide Malaysians with an alternative to Barisan Nasional and Pakatan Harapan. The Registrar of Societies (RoS) approved PAP's registration as a political party on 30 October 2015.

On 27 February 2018, founder Zulkifli Mohd Noor resigned and left the party, along with nine other central executive committee members after A. David Dass hijacked the party and become president, formed a new central executive committee and brought in mostly ethnic Indian members to fill the vacated posts. In the 2018 Malaysian general election (GE14), PAP partnered with the PAS-led Gagasan Sejahtera but failed in their maiden election with all their candidates having lost their deposits.

General election result

See also
Politics of Malaysia
List of political parties in Malaysia

References 

Political parties in Malaysia
2015 establishments in Malaysia
Political parties established in 2015